Mills is an unincorporated community located in Juab County, Utah, United States. The cemetery and few building remnants remain.

History
Settled as a railroad town, it was also known as Wellington in the mid to late 1800s. Many residents lived in dugouts or cabins. There was a local general store owned by John Williams, who lived nearby. John Williams Canyon was named after Williams.

See also

References

External links

Unincorporated communities in Juab County, Utah
Unincorporated communities in Utah
Provo–Orem metropolitan area